Khiamniungan or Khiamniungan Naga may be,
Khiamniungan people
Khiamniungan language

Language and nationality disambiguation pages